No-Hee Park is a distinguished professor of dentistry and dean emeritus at the School of Dentistry at the University of California, Los Angeles. He is also a researcher and scientist in the field of oral and craniofacial research. He has more than 170 scientific publications, nine invited review articles, nine book chapters and 180 abstracts for national and international scientific presentations.

Early life and education 
Park was born in 1944 in  Danyang County, South Korea. His family then moved to Daejeon City, where he attended elementary, junior high, and high school. In high school, Park practiced Judo, a form of martial arts; by the time he went to college, he had earned a black belt.

Park entered Seoul National University in 1962 and received a Certificate in the Arts and Sciences. In 1964, he attended Seoul National University's College of Dentistry, and received a DDS in 1968. As a dental student, he was heavily involved in scientific research, specifically pharmacology and biological chemistry. He went on to receive a Certificate in Periodontics in 1971 from Seoul National University. He then was drafted into the Korean Army, where he served for three years, 1971 to 1974, retiring as a captain.

Park was given the opportunity to conduct research for a year as a postdoctoral fellow at the Medical College of Georgia at Georgia Regents University in 1975. At the end of the year, he decided to stay and pursue a PhD degree in pharmacology, which he received in 1978. From 1978 to 1982 he served as a research associate at the Harvard University/Eye Research Institute, while pursuing a Certificate in Virology and Molecular Biology Fellowship, which he earned in 1980. He then entered Harvard School of Dental Medicine to work towards an American dental degree, and he received a Doctor of Dental Medicine (DMD) degree in 1982.

Career 
In 1982 he became an assistant professor in the Department of Oral Biology and Pathophysiology at the Harvard School of Dental Medicine. In 1984 he relocated to the University of California Los Angeles (UCLA) School of Dentistry, starting as an associate professor in the Section of Oral Biology for a year, then becoming a professor in 1985. In 2004, he also became a professor in the Department of Medicine (Division of Hematology and Oncology) at the David Geffen School of Medicine at UCLA. In 2006 he was named a distinguished professor at both schools. During his time at UCLA, Park also served as the associate director of UCLA Dental Research Institute (July 1986 – June 1990), the associate dean for Research, UCLA School of Dentistry (January 1997 – June 1998), and the director of the UCLA Dental Research Institute (January 1995 – June 2002). He is currently serving as dean of the UCLA School of Dentistry.

Academic and research achievements 

Park's early foray into research (1975–1983) focused on the study of molecular mechanisms of numerous antiviral agents (e.g., Zovirax®) against herpes simplex virus by evaluating their therapeutic efficacy in animal models. In 1983, Park changed the focus of his research to the study of the mechanisms of human oral cancer development, clarifying and expounding the role of human papillomavirus in the development of human cancer.

Between 1978 and 2014, while at Harvard and UCLA, Park received close to $60 million extramural funds from the U.S. government and private industry for his research programs, and he trained more than 100 postdoctoral fellows, research students, and visiting faculty members. Many of the people he trained have gone on to become university faculty members in the United States and many other countries, including Korea, Japan, China and various European countries.

He has held leadership positions in numerous research organizations. He served NIH as a grant review committee member (1998, 1990, 1993, 1991–95, 1995, 1997–98, 2005) and has been an editorial board member of numerous journals, including the Journal of Dental Research (1995–1997), International Journal of Oral Biology (1996–2001), European Journal of Cancer (1995–1999), International Journal of Oncology (1996–present), the Electronic Journal of Biotechnology (1997–present), Odontology (2000–present), and Critical Review of Oncogenesis (2011–present).

Inventions and patents 

 "Medical herbs and their anti-microbial applications", UCLA case N. 2002-409-1 (inventor)
 "Tumor Suppressive Effect of hnRNP G", UCLA case No.2006-093 (primary inventor)
 "Conversion of Normal Human Oral Keratinocytes to Pluipotent Stem Cells", UCLA Case No. 2011-061 (co-primary inventor)
 The Utilization Of Anti-Il-36 Receptor Antibody To Treat Drug-Induced Osteonecrosis Of The Jaw, 2013

Selected honors and awards 

 2001: Distinguished Scientist Award from the International Association for Dental Research (IADR), Chiba, Japan
 2001: Recognized as a Distinguished Dean, UCLA School of Dentistry 
 2002: Distinguished Overseas Compatriots' Prize (Distinguished Scientist in the Area of Natural Sciences), KBS (Korean Broadcasting System)
 2002: The First Alumnus of the Year, Seoul National University College of Dentistry, Seoul, Korea
 2006:  Awarded title of Distinguished Professor (of Dentistry and Medicine), UCLA
 2007: Distinguished Alumnus of the Year, Seoul National University (University wide selection), Seoul, Korea
 2007: Silver Anniversary Award, Harvard University
 2009: Establishment of Dr. No-Hee Park Endowed Chair in Dentistry at the UCLA
 2010: The Gies Award as the Most Achieved Dental Educator by the Gies Foundation of the American Dental Education Association (ADEA) Dr. Park was selected for his achievements as an educator in the dentistry field.
 2010: Distinguished Alumnus of the Year, Medical College of Georgia, Augusta, Georgia
 2012: AAAS Fellowship - Dr. Park was awarded for significant contributions to the field of oral cancer and dental education, particularly for oral carcinogenesis, viral infection and cellular aging.
 2012: Eminent Scholar, Kyung Hee University, Seoul, Korea

Personal life 
No-Hee Park married Yubai Park in 1969. They have a daughter, son-in-law, and granddaughter, who reside in Atlanta, Georgia.

References 

1944 births
Living people
South Korean dentists
American dentistry academics
American dentists
Seoul National University alumni
Harvard School of Dental Medicine alumni